Portrait of a Girl (Romanian: Portret de fată) is a picture by Romanian painter Marcel Janco from 1930.

Description
The picture was painted in oil on canvas and has dimensions of 110 x 85 cm.

Analysis
The painting presents a young girl sitting in a chair. In her left hand she holds a book titled "Vie", as her hands touch the armrests of her chair. The face, hair and clothes of the girl have a strong geometry, highlighting the contours and details. Behind the chair is a monkey who plays with the hair of the girl. Objects in the room blend into the background, yet are well defined. Gray, ocher, brown, and black dominate the color scheme, highlighted with yellow, white and red. The style of the work can be assigned to cubism and constructivism.

References 

1930 paintings
Romanian paintings
Constructivism (art)
Cubist paintings